Cornish Township is the name of some places in the U.S. state of Minnesota:
Cornish Township, Aitkin County, Minnesota
Cornish Township, Sibley County, Minnesota

Minnesota township disambiguation pages